SitEx is a database that maps the protein functional sites on the genome.

See also
 Active site

References

External links
 http://www-bionet.sscc.ru/sitex/.

Biological databases
Enzymes